Wheeling Creek is a tributary of the Ohio River,  long, in eastern Ohio in the United States. It flows for its entire length in Belmont County; its tributaries also drain small areas of south-eastern Harrison County and south-western Jefferson County.

Wheeling Creek rises in Flushing Township just east of the community of Flushing, and flows generally east through Union, Wheeling, Richland, Colerain, and Pease Townships, past the communities of Lafferty, Bannock, Fairpoint, Maynard, Barton, Blaine, Lansing, and Brookside, to Bridgeport, where it flows into the Ohio River from the west, just upstream of the mouth of West Virginia's Wheeling Creek on the opposite bank.  The National Road (U.S. Route 40) parallels the stream between Bridgeport and Blaine.

Flow rate
Between 1984 and 2005, the annual mean flow of the creek at the gauge was 115 cubic feet per second (3 m³/s). The creek's highest flow during the period was 8,500 ft³/s (241 m³/s) on September 17, 2004. The lowest recorded flow was 7 ft³/s (0.2 m³/s) on September 21, 1985.

Variant names
According to the Geographic Names Information System, Wheeling Creek has also been known historically as:
Indian Wheeling Creek
Scalp Creek
Spit Head Creek
Spithead Creek

See also
List of rivers of Ohio
Blaine Hill "S" Bridge

References

External links
USGS Real-Time Water Data for Wheeling Creek below Blaine

Rivers of Ohio
Tributaries of the Ohio River
Rivers of Belmont County, Ohio
Allegheny Plateau